Reginetta d'Italia is an Italian beauty pageant.

History 
Since 2012 from Devis Paganelli, the contest has been one of four Italian beauty contests accredited by the Italian Fashion and Entertainment Professionals (Coordinamento Italiano Professionisti della Moda dello Spettacolo).

Reginetta d'Italia

References

Beauty pageants in Italy